Superintendent Joseph Kipley (November 25, 1848 – February 6, 1904) was Head of the Chicago Police Department from 1897 to 1901. He succeeded John J. Badenoch and was succeeded by Francis O'Neill.

Early life
Kipley was born in Paterson, New Jersey, in 1848. He moved to Chicago in 1865. He worked at a picture frame factory which burned down in the Great Chicago Fire in October 1871.

Police career

Three months after the fire, he joined the Chicago Police Department, and he worked there for many years. He was named Inspector and then an Assistant Superintendent, but when George Bell Swift was elected mayor of Chicago in 1895, Kipley no longer had a position in the department. For the next two years, Kipley organized the Star League, a political group consisting of former Chicago police officers. Kipley was appointed Chief of Police of Chicago by Mayor Carter Harrison Jr. in 1897.

Death
In early 1904, Kipley began to experience stomach problems. He underwent an operation, but it left him very ill and he died a few days later on 6 February  1904. A death notice in the St. Louis Republic called him "the most widely known Chief of Police Chicago ever had."

Legacy
The Ice Pond Mystery, a detective novel written by Kipley as a police lieutenant, was published posthumously by the J.S. Ogilvie Publishing Company as part of its Shield Series. 

The fictional character of Detective Joseph Kipley in Manacle and Bracelet; or, the Dead Man's Secret, A Thrilling Detective Story, by Edmund C. Strong, in which Detective Kipley solves a series of crimes in Chicago, including murder, is based on the real Joseph Kipley.

Gallery

References

1848 births
1904 deaths
General Superintendents of the Chicago Police Department
People from Paterson, New Jersey